Andrew F. Kay (January 22, 1919 – August 28, 2014) was a businessman and innovator. He was President and CEO of Kaypro, a personal computer company, which at one time was the  world's fourth largest manufacturer of computers, and the largest in the world in sales of portable computers.

Kay, a 1940 graduate of MIT, started his career with Bendix followed by two years at Jet Propulsion Laboratory. In 1952, Kay founded Non-Linear Systems, a manufacturer of digital instrumentation. NLS developed a reputation for providing rugged durability in critical applications for everything from submarines to spacecraft. At NLS he invented the digital voltmeter, in 1954.

Kaypro began selling computers in the early 1980s. In 1985, it had more than $120 million in revenues, dwarfing what had been its parent, NLS. But the company's success was relatively short-lived; in 1990 it filed for Chapter 11 bankruptcy protection, and it was liquidated in 1992.

In the late 1990s, Kay founded Kay Computers, which similarly manufactured and sold personal computers. The company lasted for less than ten years.

Kay later was a Senior Business Advisor to Accelerated Composites, LLC.

He co-founded the Rotary Club of Del Mar, California.

References

External links
, AcceleratedComposites.com; accessed September 8, 2014.
Computer pioneer Andrew Kay dies at 95, utsandiego.com; accessed September 8, 2014.
 Andrew Kay obituary, legacy.com; accessed September 8, 2014.
 
 Patent 2813266  Patent for Indicator Device and Means for Mounting (1957)

American computer businesspeople
American inventors
American technology company founders
Businesspeople from California
1919 births
2014 deaths
Businesspeople from Akron, Ohio
People from Del Mar, California
Massachusetts Institute of Technology alumni
20th-century American businesspeople
Bendix Corporation people